Cyphocerastis is a genus of grasshoppers in the family Acrididae.

References

External links 
 

Acrididae genera